Return to Cookie Mountain is the second studio album by American rock band TV on the Radio. It was released July 6, 2006, worldwide by 4AD, and issued in the U.S. and Canada on September 12, 2006, by Interscope Records and Touch and Go Recordings. The North American release features three bonus tracks, two of which are B-sides from the single "Wolf Like Me"; the other is a remix of "Hours" by El-P. Videos were made for the singles "Wolf Like Me" and "Province".

The album featured several notable guest vocalists: "Province" features backing vocals from David Bowie, who championed the band's full-length debut, Desperate Youth, Blood Thirsty Babes; Katrina Ford of the band Celebration guests on "Wolf Like Me", "Let the Devil In" and "Blues from Down Here"; Kazu Makino of Blonde Redhead sings on "Hours". This is their first album to feature the keyboardist Gerard Smith.

Reception

Return to Cookie Mountain earned overwhelmingly positive reviews from critics, and was named the album of the year by Spin for 2006, leading to the band's appearance on the magazine's cover. The album was ranked second on Pitchfork Media's list of Top 50 Albums of 2006. Rolling Stone, Slant Magazine, and Stylus Magazine each named the album as the fourth best of 2006, and the album is ranked fifth on Metacritic's year-end list. In 2009, Rhapsody ranked the album at eighth on its "100 Best Albums of the Decade" list.
In December 2007 the album was ranked number 96 in Blender (magazine)'s 100 Greatest Indie-Rock Albums Ever.

As of 2014, sales in the United States have exceeded 242,000 copies, according to Nielsen SoundScan.

Track listing
 "I Was a Lover" (Kyp Malone, David Andrew Sitek) – 4:21
 "Hours" (Tunde Adebimpe) – 3:55
 "Province" (Malone, Sitek) – 4:37
 "Playhouses" (Malone) – 5:11
 "Wolf Like Me" (Adebimpe) – 4:39
 "A Method" (Adebimpe) – 4:25
 "Let the Devil In" (Malone) – 4:27
 "Dirtywhirl" (Adebimpe) – 4:15
 "Blues from Down Here" (Malone) – 5:17
 "Tonight" (Adebimpe) – 6:53
 "Wash the Day" (Malone, Sitek, Adebimpe) – 8:08

Sample credits
 "Let the Devil In" includes extended samples from Lou Reed's 1975 noise album Metal Machine Music during the verses.

US bonus tracks
[silence]
…
 "Untitled" – 1:44
 "Snakes and Martyrs" (Malone) – 4:07
 "Hours (El-P remix)" (Adebimpe) – 4:26
 "Things You Can Do" (Adebimpe, Sitek) – 5:26

Personnel
TV on the Radio

 Tunde Adebimpe – vocals , percussion , choir 
 Jaleel Bunton – drums , piano , guitar , percussion , choir , Rhodes 
 Kyp Malone – vocals , bass , guitar 
 Dave Sitek – guitars , bass , samples , flute , sampler , keys , synth , magic 
 Gerard Smith – piano , organ , bass , choir , guitar , electric sitar 

Additional personnel
 Kazu Makino – vocals 
 Jeremy Wilms – cello 
 David Bowie – vocals 
 Omega "C Taylor" Moon – vocals 
 Katrina Ford – vocals 
 Martin Perna – baritone saxophone , horns 
 Aaron Aites – choir 
 Dragons of Zynth: Akwetey & Aku Orraca-Tetteh, Devang Arvind Shah – choir, percussion 
 Shanina Robinson – vocals 
 Stuart D. Bogie – bass harmonica, bass clarinet 
 Chris Taylor – horns , clarinet , horn arrangement

Charts

References

2006 albums
TV on the Radio albums
Interscope Records albums
4AD albums
Albums produced by Dave Sitek
Electronic rock albums by American artists
Post-punk revival albums
Experimental rock albums by American artists
Psychedelic music albums by American artists
Shoegaze albums by American artists
Space rock albums
Post-punk albums by American artists